Silica, Wisconsin is an unincorporated community in the Town of Taycheedah in Fond du Lac County, Wisconsin.

History
A post office called Silica was in operation from 1898 until 1904. The community was so named on account of the sandy soil, Silica being the Latin word meaning "sand".

Prior to being named Silica it was named Summit

Notes

Unincorporated communities in Wisconsin
Unincorporated communities in Fond du Lac County, Wisconsin